The extreme points of South America are the points that are farther north, south, east or west than any other location on the continent. The continent's southernmost point is often said to be Cape Horn, but Águila Islet of the Diego Ramírez Islands lies further south.

Latitude and longitude 
Geographic coordinates expressed in WGS 84.

South America
 Northernmost point: Bajo Nuevo keys in San Andrés y Providencia Department, Colombia
 Southernmost point can be either:
Águila Islet, Diego Ramírez Islands, Chile, or, if the South Sandwich Islands are included as part of South America:
Cook Island, South Georgia and the South Sandwich Islands
 Westernmost point can be either:
Darwin Island, Galápagos Islands, Ecuador, or, if Easter Island is included as part of South America:
Motu Nui
 Easternmost point can be either:
Ilha do Sul, Trindade and Martim Vaz, Brazil, or, if the South Sandwich Islands are included as part of South America:
Montagu Island, South Georgia and the South Sandwich Islands

South America (mainland)
 Northernmost point: Punta Gallinas, Colombia
 Southernmost point: Cape Froward, Chile
 Westernmost point: Punta Pariñas, Peru
 Easternmost point: Ponta do Seixas, Brazil

Center: 40 km. NWbN of Fuerte Olimpo, Alto Paraguay, Paraguay

Elevation
Highest point: Aconcagua, Mendoza, Argentina at 6961 m
Lowest point: Laguna del Carbón, Santa Cruz, Argentina  at −105 m

See also
Geography of South America
Extreme points of the Earth
Extreme points of the Americas
Extreme points of North America
Extreme points of Central America
Extreme points of the Caribbean
Extreme points of South America
Extreme points of Argentina
Extreme points of Brazil
Extreme points of Chile
Extreme points of Colombia
Extreme points of Peru

Notes

References

External links

Geography of South America
South America
South America
South America